Freeride is a widely used sporting term and may refer to:

 Freeriding (sport), a style of skiing or snowboarding
 Freeride (longboard), a discipline of longboarding
 Freeride (mountain biking), a branch of mountain biking
 Freeride kayaking
 Boulder Freeride, a University of Colorado skiing club
 Freeride, a brand of freeline skates
 Freeride, a model of KTM off-road motorcycle
 Freerider, a free climbing route on El Capitan

See also 
 Free ride (disambiguation)